Connolley (from Ó Conghalaigh) may refer to:
 William Connolley
Connolley is not to be confused with other surnames such as:
 Connolly (surname)
 Connelly (surname)

See also
 Connolly (disambiguation)
 Connelly (disambiguation)